South China Agricultural University (SCAU) is a provincial public university in Guangzhou, Guangdong, China. Founded in 1909, the university is considered to have an advantage in the field of agricultural science. It is a Double First Class University.

The university has 26 colleges and more than 40,000 students, including international students from over 40 countries.

History 
 1909 - Guangdong province's agricultural experiment station and Affiliated Institute of Agriculture was founded.
 1917 - Guangdong Province Public Agricultural School, and began to set up agricultural major(4-year degree).
 1924 - Incorporated into Guangdong University, as College of Agriculture.
 1926 - Rename to College of Agriculture, National Sun Yat-sen University.
 1931 - Sun Yat sen University prepared to build a new campus in Shipai, and totally received about 3.5 square kilometers of land in the north of Shipai, The College of Agricultural college starts to develop rapidly.
 1952 - The nationwide readjustments of university and college resources took place in 1952. And the South China Agricultural College was established, through a reorganization process that unified the agricultural schools and departments of universities from 2 provinces in Southern China, including the former National Sun Yat-sen University, Lingnan University, Guangxi University.
 1979 - It was selected as one of National Key Universities.
 1984 - The university was renamed as South China Agricultural University in 1984.
 2000 - The university was transferred under the administration of Guangdong Province in 2000 during the reform of the management system of higher learning institutions.
 2015 - Selected as a Cultivated High-level University of Guangdong Province.
 2022 - Became one of the Double First-Class Universities in Double First Class University Plan.

Campus 
The campus of South China Agricultural University is located in Tianhe District, Guangzhou, it used to be part of the old National Sun Yat-sen University campus. The main campus covers an area of over 4407 mu ( 2.95 km²), and the teaching and research base in Zengcheng covers an area of over 3863 mu ( 2.57 km²). The campus is informally divided into three parts by the South China expressway, with viaduct and culvert connected.

Architecture
The campus still retains part of the architecture of old National Sun Yat-sen University, and the rest of them are in South China University of Technology,  the whole complex is just like a bell. The most famous one is the NO.5 Building, which used to the College of Science, old National Sun Yat-sen University, and now it is the University History Museum.

Library

The Library was established in 1953 by combining parts of the Sun Yat-sen University Library, the Ling Nan University agriculture college library and Guangxi University Agriculture College library.

The SCAU Library has recently been developed into four branches, the Main Library, the East Branch, the Yuejin Branch, and the college libraries.

The total paper-based collections have been over 2.42 million items/volumes in 2016. Those collections cover agriculture, engineering, liberal arts, basic sciences, economics, management, law, education, history, philosophy and other subjects.

Museum
South China Agricultural Museum open at Nov 2019, which is the first agricultural museum with the theme of agriculture and natural resources in south China. By Oct 2019, the museum has received over 1901 specimens and exhibits. There are eight exhibition halls, including Guangdong agricultural history, traditional agricultural tools, soil and rock, plant world, animal world, insect world, South China Sea marine life, forestry resources and utilization.

Transportation
Wushan Station on the Guangzhou Metro is located in front of the south entrance to the campus. And the university also provide the school bus which connect the different areas of the campus or the metro station.

Academics 
South China Agricultural University has 26 colleges (departments), offering 95 undergraduate programs, 107 master's degree programs and 60 Ph.D degree programs. SCAU also offers 9 Professional master's degrees and a Professional Doctorate in Veterinary Medicine.

Colleges and schools

Research institution 
The university consists of various research institutes such as:

Rankings 
The individual subject ranking of South China Agricultural University was 50th-100th in Agriculture & Forestry according to the QS World University Rankings for 2016.
The university ranked 962th according to the US News Best Global Universities 2017. In particular, its Agricultural Sciences was ranked 177th, and its Plant and Animal Science was ranked 228th.

Admission 
The total enrollment of students is over 42,000, comprising 36,560 undergraduates, 6,301 graduates and 121 foreign students from 43 countries.

Student life

Student organization
There are a lot of student organization in the university including the Student Union, Student Association Union, Youth Volunteer Service Centre and more than 60 student associations.

Services 
The Modern Educational Technology Center is installed with visual-audio and multi-media input-output equipment. Other direct services for students include: 
one on-campus English-learning radio
one Employment Orientation Center for Graduating Students
one Work for Study Service Center
one Psychological Center
two Students' Activity Center
three stadiums with standardized synthetic rubber tracks and other specialized playgrounds are available for different sports
The collection of the university library surpasses 2.42 million copies. 
19 on-campus fieldwork bases and 339 off-campus fieldwork bases are open to students.

International cooperation 

It has established inter-institutional ties with twenty-three universities from thirteen countries in Europe, America, Asia and Oceania. There are more and more academic exchanges between SCAU and universities in HongKong and Macao. In promoting the international multi-agricultural technological exchanges, the UNDP, FAO and WFC have attached great importance to the university and established the Regional Sericulture Training Center for Asia and Pacific and China International Center for Agricultural Training in SCAU. Up to now, the university has trained around 1000 overseas students and numerous research and government officials from over 50 countries in Asia, Europe, Africa, America, and Oceania.

America

Asia

Europe

Oceania

References

External links 

 South China Agricultural University

 
Universities and colleges in Guangzhou
Educational institutions established in 1909
1909 establishments in China
Tianhe District